The Betty Trask Prize and Awards are for first novels written by authors under the age of 35, who reside in a current or former Commonwealth nation. Each year the awards total £20,000, with one author receiving a larger prize amount, called the "Prize", and the remainder given to one or more other writers, called the "Awards". The award was established in 1984 by the Society of Authors, at the bequest of the late Betty Trask, a reclusive author of over thirty romance novels. The awards are given to traditional or romantic novels, rather than those of an experimental style, and can be for published or unpublished works.

List of award and prize winners

1980s

1990s

2000s
Since 2009, the Betty Trask Prize has been given to a single author; the remaining receive the Betty Trask Award. A blue ribbon indicates the winner for that year.

2010s

2020s

References

External links
 The Betty Trask Prizes and Awards: Past Winners

Commonwealth literary awards
Society of Authors awards
First book awards
British fiction awards
Awards established in 1984
Literary awards honouring young writers